Legionella feeleii is a Gram-negative, rod-shaped bacterium from the genus Legionella  which was isolated from an automobile plant and which was held responsible for causing Pontiac fever in 317 workers. The organism did not grow on blood agar, required L-cysteine, and showed significant quantities of branched-chain fatty acids. More recently, an unusual, extrapulmonary case was described in a 66-year-old woman admitted to Hopital Nord, Marseille, France because of a complicated cellulitis and an abscess on her right leg following a suspected  insect or spider bite.

References

External links	
Type strain of Legionella feeleii at BacDive -  the Bacterial Diversity Metadatabase

Legionellales
Bacteria described in 1984